The 4th Women's European Amateur Boxing Championships were held in Tønsberg, Norway from May 8 to 15, 2005.
This edition of the recurring competition was organised by the European governing body for amateur boxing, EABA.
Competitions took place in 13 weight classes.

Russia topped the medals table, as they had done in the three previous editions of these championships.
Cecilia Brækhus of Norway was voted best boxer of the tournament.

Medal table

Medal winners

References

Boxing
Women's European Amateur Boxing Championships
International boxing competitions hosted by Norway
European
Tønsberg
May 2005 sports events in Europe